Sgt. Mark A. Rademacher Memorial Park, commonly known as Hunters Creek Park, is a  park located in the Town of Wales in the U.S. state of New York. The park is operated by Erie County Department of Parks, Recreation and Forestry, and is a popular destination for hiking, mountain biking and horseback riding.

According to the 2003 Erie County Parks System Master Plan, Hunters Creek Park is classified as a conservation park. These parks are managed primarily for conservation of the natural environment and passive nature-based outdoor recreation activities, and are intended to generally remain in a natural state.

The largely-undeveloped park sits upon land purchased by Erie County in the 1970s. The park was renamed "Sgt. Mark A. Rademacher Memorial Park" in 1983 in honor of a 20-year-old US Army Ranger from the Town of Wales who died in the Invasion of Grenada.

References

External links 
 Hunters Creek Park topographic map from the Western New York Mountain Bike Association

Parks in Erie County, New York